"Kiss Away" is the eighth single by pop singer Ronnie Dove in 1965.

Written by Billy Sherrill and Glenn Sutton, it peaked at number 25 on the Billboard Hot 100.

Chart performance

Jane Morgan version 
Jane Morgan also recorded the song on an album for Epic Records.  It was also used as the B-side of her cover single of Len Barry's "1-2-3".  It reached number 16 on the Billboard Easy Listening chart in 1966.

Other versions 
Two years later, Sherrill became Tammy Wynette's producer and she recorded the song on her D-I-V-O-R-C-E album.

The song has also been recorded by David Houston and Brenda Lee.

References

Songs about kissing
1965 singles
Ronnie Dove songs
Tammy Wynette songs
Songs written by Billy Sherrill
Songs written by Glenn Sutton
1965 songs